John Coutinho (born 11 September 1989 in Mumbai, Maharashtra) is an Indian footballer who plays as a midfielder for Mumbai F.C. in the I-League.

Career

Mumbai
Coutinho started his footballing career with the Mumbai FC U19 team in 2008. In 2009 Coutinho started becoming a part in the Mumbai FC U19 squad that played in the Mumbai Super Division which included a winning goal against Air India U19s in the super-six round on 18 February 2009. Coutinho then made his debut for the Mumbai F.C. first-team during the last match of the 2011-12 I-League season against Chirag United Kerala on 6 May 2012 at the Balewadi Sports Complex in which Mumbai lost 5–2.

Career statistics

Club

References

Indian footballers
1989 births
Living people
I-League players
Mumbai FC players
Footballers from Mumbai
Association football midfielders